Zainul Abedin (11 January 2014) is a Bangladesh Nationalist Party politician and the ormer Member of Parliament of Mymensingh-4 and Mymensingh-8.

Career
Abedin was a lawyer and politician. he was elected to parliament from Mymensingh-4 as a Bangladesh Nationalist Party candidate in 1979. He was elected to parliament from Mymensingh-8 as a Bangladesh Nationalist Party candidate in 15 February 1996 Bangladeshi general election. He was the president of Ishwarganj Upazila BNP.

He joined the Liberal Democratic Party (LDP) on 26 October 2006 and served as a presidium member and president of the Mymensingh district LDP.

Death 
Zainul Abedin died on 11 January 2014.

References 

Bangladesh Nationalist Party politicians
1944 births
2nd Jatiya Sangsad members
2014 deaths
6th Jatiya Sangsad members